William John Woodhouse (7 November 1866 – 26 October 1937) was a classical scholar and author, professor of Greek at the University of Sydney.

Early life
Woodhouse was born at Clifton, Westmorland, England, the son of Richard Woodhouse, a station master, and his wife Mary, née Titterington. Educated at Sedbergh School, Yorkshire, Woodhouse won an open exhibition to Queen's College, Oxford, (B.A., 1889; M.A., 1895). He graduated with a first class in classical and a first class in the final school of Literae Humaniores, was appointed a Newton student at the British School at Athens, and during 1890 travelled in Greece and directed the excavations at Megalopolis. 
After another year at Oxford Woodhouse was elected Craven fellow and returned to Greece for two years, 
his main work being in connexion with the explorations at Aetolia. Woodhouse was awarded the Conington memorial prize at Oxford in 1894 for an essay which was expanded into a substantial volume, Aetolia. Its Geography, Topography and Antiquities (1897). In 1897 Woodhouse was appointed lecturer in classics at the University College of North Wales, Bangor; on 28 March 1897 at the parish church, Sedbergh, Yorkshire, he married Eleanor Emma Jackson. In 1900 Woodhouse was appointed lecturer in ancient history and political philosophy at the University of St Andrews, 
Scotland.

Career in Australia
Woodhouse became professor of Greek at the University of Sydney in 1901, succeeding Walter Scott and held the chair until his death. Woodhouse was also honorary curator of the Nicholson Museum of Antiquities at the university, which showed considerable development under his care. In 1908 he travelled back to Greece and laid the foundation for a collection of casts of sculpture for the Museum.

Woodhouse was a teacher who inspired his students, his broad scholarship was relieved by both wit and humour, and he was a most painstaking researcher. Possibly it was the humility of a true scholar that accounted for so much of his work being delayed publication until his later years. These qualities were recognized by his students and he gained both their respect and affection. He shared in the life of the university, helped in the organization of the union, and for a 
period was dean of the faculty of arts and a member of the senate. Apart from a few classical textbooks and The Tutorial History of Greece, published in 1904 (fourth impression 1915), Woodhouse for many years published only some contributions to the Journal of Hellenic Studies. Woodhouse brought out The Composition of Homer's Odyssey (1930), a valuable and original contribution to Homeric scholarship. This was followed by King Agis of Sparta and his Campaign in Arkadia in 418 B.C.(1933). His task was to do belated justice to King Agis "one of those born leaders who, taking no counsel of their fears, but accepting with serene self-reliance risks that appal a mediocre mind, compel their astonished adversaries to taste the bitterness of decisive and sometimes humiliating defeat" (p. 125). Woodhouse's adverse criticism of Thucydides's description of the battle of Mantinea did not find universal acceptance, but "he seems to have established that Thucydides's account is highly partisan, designed to show Agis in the role of lucky blunderer".

Late life and legacy
Woodhouse's last book, Solon the Liberator, a Study of the Agrarian problem in Attika in the Seventh Century (published posthumously, 1938) was completed just before his death. Other books were left unfinished.

Woodhouse died of cancer in Gordon, Sydney on 26 October 1937 leaving a widow, a son and a daughter. Woodhouse was the author of The Fight for an Empire, a translation from Tacitus (1931), and was also a contributor to the Encyclopaedia Biblica and the Encyclopaedia of Religion and Ethics.

References

External link
 Woodhouse Archive Flickr Project
 Nicholson Museum on Flickr - "complete collection of the sites, monuments and landscapes of Greece photographed by Woodhouse at the turn of the 20th century"

1866 births
1937 deaths
Academic staff of the University of Sydney
Classical scholars of the University of Sydney
English classical scholars